West Valley may refer to:
 West Valley (California), a geographical area of Santa Clara County
 West Valley (Phoenix metropolitan area), a geographical area of the Phoenix metropolitan area
 West Valley, New York
 West Valley, Pennsylvania, an unincorporated community
 West Valley, Washington, a census-designated place in Yakima County
 West Valley City, Utah, in Salt Lake County
 West Valley Central, Utah Transit Authority Intermodal Transit Hub
 West Valley College, in Saratoga, California
 West Valley Demonstration Project, in New York
 West Valley Township, Minnesota, a township in Marshall County
 The western section of the Valley of the Kings in Egypt
 West Valley Fault, part of the Marikina Valley Fault System

See also
State Route 85 (California), also known as "West Valley Freeway"